9wm is an open source stacking window manager for X11, written by David Hogan (dhog) in 1994 to emulate the Plan 9 Second
Edition window manager, 8 . Many later minimalist window managers for
X were either inspired by, or directly derived from, 9wm. 9wm takes only 0.4 MB in RAM.

The README file in the 9wm source distribution describes it like so:

Features
9wm does not support a menubar, titlebars, maximize, multiple desktops, desktop shortcuts, theming or a desktop wallpaper.

A right click on the root window (desktop) opens a context menu providing window operations (move, resize, delete, hide); a list of up to 32 hidden windows which may be unhidden by selecting from the menu; and a command to launch a terminal emulator (typically 9term). Applications are launched via terminal only, and there is no additional task switching facility.

9wm uses a click to focus model and requires a three-button mouse. There are no keyboard controls or XKeys support. New windows are drawn by prompting the user to "sweep out" a screen rectangle for the window, which may be considered focus stealing if an application unexpectedly requests a new window. Window borders originally did nothing but indicate focus—draggable borders for move and resize were eventually added to rio in Plan 9 from Bell Labs and Plan 9 from User Space. 

9wm is written in C using the Xlib toolkit and has no other dependencies. An undocumented -nostalgia option enables a Blit cursor, which John Mackin insisted on.

Resizing windows
Window geometry is described by "sweeping out" a rectangle on the screen. To sweep, click and hold the right button at one corner of the desired rectangle, move the mouse to the diagonally opposite corner, and release the button. Placing new windows and resizing existing windows are done by sweep operations.

Relicensing following creator's death
During the period when 9wm was maintained by David Hogan, the license was as follows: 
Licence
=======

  9wm is free software, and is Copyright (c) 1994 by David Hogan.
  Permission is granted to all sentient beings to use this software,
  to make copies of it, and to distribute those copies, provided
  that:

      (1) the copyright and licence notices are left intact
      (2) the recipients are aware that it is free software
      (3) any unapproved changes in functionality are either
            (i) only distributed as patches
        or (ii) distributed as a new program which is not called 9wm
                and whose documentation gives credit where it is due
      (4) the author is not held responsible for any defects
          or shortcomings in the software, or damages caused by it.

  There is no warranty for this software.  Have a nice day.

After the death of David Hogan, the succeeding maintainers going by the name "The Estate of David Hogan" relicensed version 1.1 and later versions under the MIT License.

9wm derivatives and 9wm-inspired window managers
 larswm
 aewm
 wm2 and wmx
 wmii
 dwm
 rio in Plan 9 from User Space
 cwm
 lwm

References

External links

 

Free software programmed in C
Free X window managers
Plan 9 from Bell Labs